FTS may refer to:

 Fatehpur Sikri railway station, in Uttar Pradesh, India
 Federal Tax Service (Russia)
 Fellow of the Theosophical Society
 Ferrocarriles y Transportes Suburbanos, a former Spanish railway company
 File transfer service
 Find a Tender Service, the UK's public sector system for locating tender opportunities from 1 January 2021
 First-tier supplier, a role in Supply Chain
 "First Touch Soccer", former name of Dream League Soccer
 Fischer–Tropsch synthesis
 Fleet telematics system
 Flight termination system
 Floppy trunk syndrome
 Flow-through share
 Follow-the-sun
 Fourier-transform spectroscopy
 Fox Television Stations, a group of American television stations
 Fredon Township School, of the Fredon Township School District
 Freedom Team Salute, a program of the United States Army
 Free the Slaves, an American human rights organization
 Friends of Tribals Society, a volunteer organization in India
 From the Shallows, an American deathcore band
 Fujitsu Technology Solutions, a European electronics vendor
 Full text search

See also 
 FT (disambiguation)